Focus News is a Hindi-language 24/7 news television channel, owned by Focus News Network. The channel is a free-to-air and launched in 2013. The channel is available across all major cable and DTH platforms, as well as online.

References

Hindi-language television channels in India
Television channels and stations established in 2015
Hindi-language television stations
Television channels based in Noida
2015 establishments in Uttar Pradesh